Major General Chesley G. Peterson (August 10, 1920 – January 28, 1990) was a career officer in the United States Air Force, and a flying ace of the United States Army Air Forces (USAAF) in World War II. As a fighter pilot in the European theater, he is best known for his time as the commander of the famous 4th Fighter Group during 1942–1943. At 23, he was the youngest colonel in the USAAF.

Early years
Peterson was born in Idaho, but moved to Utah in his childhood. He joined the Utah National Guard in 1937. In 1939, he joined the Army Air Corps and was selected for air cadet training, but was dismissed before graduation from flight school. He moved to Los Angeles after being dropped from flight school and was working at Douglas Aircraft when he became interested in flying for the Royal Air Force (RAF), who were at that time recruiting Americans to fight the Germans.

World War II

Eagle Squadron
Peterson arrived in England in late 1940 and was assigned to No. 71 Squadron of the Royal Air Force (RAF). No. 71 Squadron was one of the three Eagle Squadrons, made up of volunteer American pilots who served in World War II prior to the United States entering the war. The Americans would fly Hurricanes and Spitfires against the Luftwaffe. In time, he was promoted to flight lieutenant, and given command of No. 71 Squadron. Flight Lieutenant Peterson completed 42 missions while flying with the RAF. When he was given command of No. 71 Squadron, he was only 21 years old and the youngest squadron commander in the RAF.

However, he was not, as sometimes claimed, one of the Few.

4th Fighter Group
In 1942, Peterson accepted a transfer to the United States Army Air Forces (USAAF) along with the rest of the Eagle Squadron members. He was assigned to the 4th Fighter Group as the executive officer and as a major. Later he would be promoted to colonel at the age of 23, and became the youngest colonel in the USAAF.

When Peterson first joined the 4th Fighter Group, they were assigned the P-47 Thunderbolt, which was a radical change from the Spitfires the Eagle Squadron pilots had flown. His parachute failed, but miraculously Peterson survived both the fall and the dangerous Channel waters.

In January 1944, Peterson was reassigned to VIII Fighter Command as a staff officer and then to a subordinate unit of VIII Fighter Command, the 65th Fighter Wing, until returning to the United States at the end of 1944. During his time overseas, Colonel Peterson flew a total of 130 missions and was credited with nine aerial victories and nine probables.

After attending Command and General Staff School at Fort Leavenworth, Kansas, Peterson was assigned as the commander of Dale Mabry Field, Tallahassee, Florida in March 1945.  His next assignment was as chief, Air Attache Branch, Headquarters Army Air Forces, Washington, D.C., beginning in August, 1945.

Post-war Air Force career
After the war, Colonel Peterson had a variety of assignments including command and staff assignments. Despite not participating directly in either the Korean or Vietnam wars, he was assigned overseas as the commander of flying units in France and Japan during both wars.

Peterson was promoted to major general in 1965. His last assignment on active duty began on April 1, 1967, as the Assistant Chief of Staff for Intelligence, Staff, Commander in Chief, Pacific. Peterson retired July 31, 1970. He died on January 28, 1990, in Riverside, California and is buried at Riverside National Cemetery.

References

External links

Veteran Tribute
 4th Fighter Group Association World War II
 

1920 births
1990 deaths
American Royal Air Force pilots of World War II
American World War II flying aces
Aviators from Idaho
Burials at Riverside National Cemetery
People from Salmon, Idaho
Recipients of the Distinguished Service Cross (United States)
Recipients of the Distinguished Flying Cross (United States)
Recipients of the Legion of Merit
Recipients of the Air Medal
United States Air Force generals
United States Army Air Forces officers
United States Army Air Forces pilots of World War II
United States Army Command and General Staff College alumni